Gloriosa can refer to:
 Gloriosa (plant), a genus of plants in the family Colchicaceae
 Gloriosa (poem), a concert band work composed by Yasuhide Ito
 Gloriosa, a medieval bell in Erfurt Cathedral, Germany